is a former Japanese football player. He played for Japan national team.

Club career
Sasaki was born on January 30, 1936. After graduating from Kansai University, he joined Dunlop Japan in 1958.

National team career
On December 25, 1958, he debuted for Japan national team against Hong Kong. He played 14 games and scored 1 goal for Japan until 1961.

National team statistics

References

External links
 
 Japan National Football Team Database

1936 births
Living people
Kansai University alumni
Japanese footballers
Japan international footballers
Association football forwards